Ehingen Urspring is a professional basketball club based in Ehingen, Germany. The team plays in the ProB, the third German division. Ehingen has won the ProB, Germany's third tier league, twice, in 2011 and 2016.

Home games of the team are played in the Johann Vanotti Gymnasium, which has capacity for 1,500 people.

Honours
ProB
Winners (2): 2010–11, 2015–16

Players

Notable players

 Jon Godfread (2005-2006)
 Timothy Lang (2010–2011)
 Christian Standhardinger (2006–2009)
 Akeem Vargas (2006–2012)
 Garrett Williamson (2012–2013)

Season by season

External links
Official website

Basketball teams in Germany
Basketball teams established in 2005
2005 establishments in Germany